William Owtram D.D. (17 March 1626 – 23 August 1679) was a clergyman who published notable theological works. After leading the church of the House of Commons, St. Margaret's, Westminster, he gained preferment as Archdeacon of Leicester.

Life
Son of Robert Owtram, he was born at Barlow, near Chesterfield in Derbyshire, on 17 March 1625–6. On 13 May 1642 he was admitted a sizar of Trinity College, Cambridge, where he graduated B.A. in 1646. He was afterwards elected to a fellowship at Christ's College, where he graduated M.A. in 1649. In 1655 he held the university office of junior proctor, and in 1662 he was created D.D. His first church preferment was in Lincolnshire, and he subsequently obtained the rectory of St. Mary Woolnoth, London, which he resigned in 1666. In 1664 he was also Minister, but not Rector, of St. Margaret's, Westminster. He stayed in London during the plague in 1665 On 30 July 1669 he was installed Archdeacon of Leicester. On 30 July 1670 he was installed prebendary of Westminster.

Death
Owtram died on 23 August 1679, and was buried in Westminster Abbey, where a monument, with a Latin inscription, was erected to his memory. His will, dated 5 November 1677, was proved in London 3 September 1679  He bequeathed lands in Derbyshire and Lincolnshire, and left legacies to the children of his brother Francis Owtram, deceased, and of his sisters Barbara Burley and Mary Sprenthall, both deceased, and Jane Stanley, then living.

An elaborate catalogue of his library was compiled by William Cooper, London, 1681, 4to. Owtram's widow lived forty-two years after him, until 4 October 1721

Owtram was a nervous and accurate writer. and an excellent preacher, and he was reputed to have extraordinary skill in rabbinical learning.

Major works
His principal work is De Sacrificiis libri duo; quorum altero explicantur omnia Judaeorum, nonnulla Gentium Profanarum Sacrificia; altero Sacrificium Christi. Utroque Ecclesiae Catholicae his de rebus Sententia contra Faustum Socinum, ejusque sectatores defenditur, London, 1677, 4to, dedicated to Thomas Osborne, Earl of Danby. An English translation, entitled 'Two Dissertations on Sacrifices,' with additional notes and indexes by John Allen, was published in 1817. 
After his death Joseph Hindmarsh published under his name six Sermons upon Faith and Providence, and other subjects, London, 1680, but they are not genuine.

In order to do justice to his memory, his relatives caused Twenty Sermons preached upon several occasions to be published from the author's own copies, by James Gardiner, D.D., afterwards Bishop of Lincoln (2nd ed., London, 1697.

References

1626 births
1679 deaths
People from North East Derbyshire District
Alumni of Trinity College, Cambridge
Archdeacons of Leicester
Canons of Westminster